Volendam Windmill is a smock mill located on Adamic Hill Road in Holland Township, New Jersey, United States.

The windmill was designed and built in 1965 by Paul Jorgenson. The Volendam Windmill Museum is a working mill driven by wind, used for grinding raw grain into flour. The 60-foot structure is seven stories high with sail arms 68 feet from tip to tip.  In 2007, two of the sail arms of the windmill were damaged in a windstorm.  As of 2021, the county's website shows that the museum is closed.

See also
 Hunterdon Plateau

References

External links
Hunterdon County Museums - Volendam Windmill Museum
Windmill may become township's at nj.com

Buildings and structures in Hunterdon County, New Jersey
Smock mills in the United States
Flour mills in the United States
Octagonal buildings in the United States
Dutch-American culture in New Jersey
Wind power in New Jersey
Grinding mills in New Jersey
Agricultural buildings and structures in New Jersey